Yeh Wen-hua (born 20 February 1976) is a Taiwanese judoka. She competed in the women's heavyweight event at the 1996 Summer Olympics.

References

1976 births
Living people
Taiwanese female judoka
Olympic judoka of Taiwan
Judoka at the 1996 Summer Olympics
Place of birth missing (living people)
Asian Games medalists in judo
Judoka at the 1994 Asian Games
Asian Games silver medalists for Chinese Taipei
Medalists at the 1994 Asian Games
20th-century Taiwanese women